Solís  is one of seven parishes (administrative divisions) in the Corvera de Asturias municipality, within the province and autonomous community of Asturias, in northern Spain.

The population is 442 (INE 2006).

Villages
Agüera (El barrio de Lupe)
Alvares
Calabaza
Campañones
El Casal (Casal)
El Llano (El Llanu)
El Martinete
El Pontón 
La Cruzada (La Cruciada)
La Sota
Rodiles (la Capital)
Sama de Abajo (Sama Baxo)
Sama de Arriba (Sama Riba)
Santa Marina (Santa Mariña)
Táraño

References

Parishes in Corvera de Asturias